Gehyra vorax, also known as the voracious four-clawed gecko or voracious dtella, is a gecko native to Papua New Guinea, Fiji, and Tonga.

References

Gehyra
Reptiles of Indonesia
Reptiles described in 1858